The Oldmasters Museum is an art museum in Brussels, Belgium, dedicated to European painters from the 15th to the 18th centuries. It is one of the constituent museums of the Royal Museums of Fine Arts of Belgium. The museum was founded in 1801 by Napoleon. It was originally named the Musée royal d'art ancien ("Royal Museum of Ancient Art").

Collection
The museum's collection includes works by several Early Netherlandish painters, including Robert Campin, Rogier van der Weyden, Petrus Christus, Dirk Bouts, Hans Memling, Hieronymus Bosch, Gerard David, and Lucas Cranach the Elder. Other painters represented in the collection include Pieter Bruegel the Elder, Joos de Momper, Frans Snyders, Philippe de Champaigne, Peter Paul Rubens, Simon Vouet, Jusepe de Ribera, Jacques Jordaens, Anthony van Dyck, and Giovanni Battista Tiepolo.

The building
The main building which now houses the Oldmasters Museum was built as the Palace for Fine Arts (not to be confused with the current Centre for Fine Arts). It was designed by the architect Alphonse Balat and funded by King Leopold II. Balat was the king's principal architect, and the building was one part of the king's vast construction projects for Belgium. The building was completed in 1887, and stands as an example of the Beaux-Arts architecture use of themed statuary to assert the identity and meaning of the building.

The building's extensive programme of architectural sculpture includes four allegorical figures, symbolising Music, Architecture, Sculpture, and Painting, atop the four main piers, the work of sculptors , Joseph Geefs, Louis Samain, and Guillaume de Groot respectively. The gilded finial, Genius of Art, was also designed by de Groot. The three rondels representing Rubens, Van Ruysbroek, and Jean de Bologne, symbolising Painting, Architecture, and Sculpture respectively, are the work of Antoine-Joseph van Rasbourgh, Antoine-Félix Bouré and Jean Cuypers. The two bas-relief panels symbolise Music by Thomas Vincotte, and Industrial Arts by Charles Brunin. The two bronze groups on pedestals represent The Crowning of Art by Paul de Vigne, and The Teaching of Art by Charles van der Stappen.

On the side of the building, a memorial commemorates five members of the National Royalist Movement, a resistance group killed during the liberation of Brussels on 3–4 September 1944. Alongside the building's western face is a sculpture park, with works by Aristide Maillol, Emilio Greco, Paul Hanrez and Bernhard Heiliger.

See also

 Culture of Belgium
 Belgium in "the long nineteenth century"

References

Notes

Museums in Brussels
City of Brussels
Art museums and galleries in Belgium
1801 establishments in the Southern Netherlands
Art museums established in 1801